Anton La Vin is a rugby union player who currently plays for Eastern Suburbs RUFC in the New South Wales Shute Shield competition.

La Vin has represented Australia at Schoolboys, Under 19 & Under 21 level and has also represented the Classic Wallabies in the World Rugby Classic held in Bermuda in 2011 & 2012 claiming the World Rugby Classic title alongside rugby greats Matt Dunning, Andrew Johns & Brad Fittler.

He is a versatile back who predominantly  plays 12 or 13 but can also play wing or fullback.

La Vin played his 100th 1st Grade game for Easts in 2012 becoming No.54 to achieve this in the clubs proud 102-year history.

La Vin is a Sydney representative player who has also played for the Australian Barbarians.

References

External links
Player profile

Living people
Australian rugby union players
Year of birth missing (living people)